The Philadelphia Subdivision is a railroad line owned and operated by CSX Transportation in the U.S. states of Pennsylvania, Delaware, and Maryland. The line runs from Philadelphia, Pennsylvania, southwest to Baltimore, Maryland, along a former Baltimore and Ohio Railroad (B&O) line.

At its north end, CP Park (Park Junction), in Brewerytown, Philadelphia, the Philadelphia Subdivision becomes the Trenton Subdivision. The south end of the Philadelphia Subdivision is near Bay View Yard, where the Baltimore Terminal Subdivision begins.

History
The line was built by the Baltimore and Philadelphia Railroad in Pennsylvania and as a branch of the B&O Railroad in Delaware and Maryland. The line began full operation in 1886. North of Philadelphia, the B&O used the lines of the Philadelphia and Reading Railway to reach the New York City area. Passenger train service on the Philadelphia Subdivision was led by the Royal Blue, its flagship train. The B&O ceased operation of passenger trains on the subdivision in 1958, and since then the line has been used only for freight trains.

In the 1970s and 80s the line passed through leases and mergers to CSX.

As of July 2022, Aberdeen, Maryland is restoring the former B&O Aberdeen station, the last remaining station on the line.

See also
List of CSX Transportation lines

References

 Herbert H. Harwood, Jr., Royal Blue Line. Sykesville, Md.: Greenberg Publishing, 1990.

CSX Transportation lines
Rail infrastructure in Pennsylvania
Rail infrastructure in Delaware
Rail infrastructure in Maryland
Baltimore and Ohio Railroad lines